The Gordon Center for Medical Imaging is a multidisciplinary research center at Massachusetts General Hospital (MGH) and Harvard Medical School that develops biomedical imaging technologies.

The Center's central activities include: research, training and education in medical imaging, and translation of basic research into clinical applications.

The MGH Gordon Center also operates the PET Core, an MGH research service facility that synthesizes radiotracers and provides positron emission tomography (PET) imaging services for investigators.

Created in 2015 with an endowment from the Bernard and Sophia Gordon Foundation, the Gordon Center is a direct continuation of MGH’s Division of Radiological Sciences where the first positron-imaging device was invented.

Dr. Georges El Fakhri is the founding director of the Gordon Center. The Center is located in two campuses in Boston and Charlestown Navy Yard, Massachusetts.

See also

 Athinoula A. Martinos Center for Biomedical Imaging
 Massachusetts General Hospital
 Nuclear medicine
 PET

References

Laboratories in the United States
Medical research institutes in Massachusetts
Radiology organizations
Medical imaging
Nuclear medicine organizations
Massachusetts General Hospital